Major Francis Charles Claydon Yeats-Brown, DFC (15 August 1886 – 19 December 1944) was an officer in the British Indian army and the author of the memoir The Lives of a Bengal Lancer, for which he was awarded the 1930 James Tait Black Memorial Prize.

His admiration and advocacy of Italian Fascism cost him his role as editor of the Everyman paper in 1933.

Life and career
Yeats-Brown was born in Genoa in 1886, the son of the British consul Montague Yeats-Brown. He studied at Harrow and Sandhurst. When he was 20 he went to India, where he was attached to the King's Royal Rifle Corps at Bareilly in present-day Uttar Pradesh. He was then transferred to the cavalry and sent to the perennially turbulent North West Frontier region. His time there engendered in him a sympathy for the Muslim point of view, and in later years he would support the creation of an independent Pakistan.

During the First World War, Yeats-Brown saw action in France and in Mesopotamia, where he was a member of the Royal Flying Corps. His acts of bravery gained him the DFC. In 1915, his plane, piloted by Thomas White, was damaged on landing on a sabotage mission outside Baghdad, and he spent the following two years as a prisoner of war. That provided the material for his first book, Caught by the Turks (1919).

Following a temporary commission in the Royal Air Force, he returned to the Indian Army in August 1919. He retired from the army in 1924, and joined the staff of the Spectator magazine as assistant editor. He quit the post in 1928.

The Lives of a Bengal Lancer, Yeats-Brown's most famous book, was published in 1930.  The book is a memoir of his time in India from 1905 to 1914, with an emphasis on cantonment life at and around Bareilly. An immediate hit with readers and critics, the book won the James Tait Black Award that year and was turned into a successful 1935 film of the same name, starring Gary Cooper. In 1936, he published Lancer at Large, in which he showed an affinity for the principles of yoga.

During the 1930s, Yeats-Brown also became involved in right-wing politics. He was a member of the January Club and the Right Club, and wrote newspaper articles in praise of Francisco Franco and Hitler, asserting that Hitler had solved Germany's unemployment problem. He also wrote articles for New Pioneer, a far-right journal controlled by Viscount Lymington and closely linked to the British People's Party. In 1937, Hitler told Yeats-Brown in person in Nuremberg that the film The Lives of a Bengal Lancer was one of his favourites and had made it compulsory for all SS members.

In 1933, Yeats-Brown was appointed editor of the Everyman. However his enthusiastic advocacy of the cause of Fascism was "to the surprise of the Directors", and he was forced to resign within weeks. His pro-war book, Dogs of War, sold poorly.

When the Second World War broke out in 1939, Yeats-Brown took up a commission again. In 1943 and '44, he toured the camps of India and the battlefields of Burma, gathering material for a book entitled Martial India. He died in England in December 1944.

Selected works
 Caught by the Turks (1919).
 The Lives of a Bengal Lancer (1930)
 Golden Horn (1932)
 Dogs of War (1934)
 Lancer at Large (1936)
 Yoga Explained (1937)
 European Jungle (1939)
 Indian Pageant (1942)
 Martial India (1945)

Honours and awards
10 October 1919 – Flying Officer Francis Charles Claydon Yeats-Brown of the Royal Air Force is awarded the Distinguished Flying Cross in recognition of distinguished services rendered during the war.

References

External links
 
 
 

1886 births
1944 deaths
Recipients of the Distinguished Flying Cross (United Kingdom)
British writers
People educated at Harrow School
Graduates of the Royal Military College, Sandhurst
British Indian Army officers
King's Royal Rifle Corps officers
British Army personnel of World War I
Royal Flying Corps officers
World War I prisoners of war held by the Ottoman Empire
British World War I prisoners of war
Royal Air Force officers
James Tait Black Memorial Prize recipients
British fascists